Nabyl Lahlou (born 1945 in Fes, Morocco) is a Moroccan theater director, author and actor, known for being an innovative theater and film director, and is considered one of the most influential Moroccan theater directors of the 1980s.

Background
He studied theater in Paris at Académie du Théâtre de la Rue Blanche and L'Ecole Charles Dullin, and later taught at Kordj-el-Kifane (Algeria). He wrote plays in both French and Arabic; among his French plays are Ophélie n'est pas morte (Ophelia is Not Dead) (1969) and Schrischamtury (1975), and among his Arabic Les Milliandaires (The Millionaires) (1968), Les tortues (The Turtles) (1970), and Asseyez-vous sur les cadavres (Sit on Corpses) (1974).  His first medium length film was Les mortes (The Dead) (1975), while his first feature-length film was Al Kanfoudi (1978).

Theater
Lahlou directed his first play al-Sa"aa in Morocco in 1965, then left to study in France, returning in 1970.

Many of his works modify Shakespeare to reflect post-colonial Morocco.  Written in 1968, his play Ophélie n'est pas Morte was influenced from the Shakespearean, with its title being a reference to Shakespeare's Ophelia. Supported financially by the Morocco Ministry of Culture, it was first performed in 1969 by Lahlou's 'University Theater Companies'. Within the play, the two different Shaksphere characters of Hamlet and Macbeth are presented in a micro drama with the characters voluntarily paralyzed and their acting confined by the use of crutches or wheelchairs.  His production of al-Salahef (The Turtles) was considered a breakthrough.

Filmography
Les mortes (featurette,1975)
Al Kanfoudi (1978)
Le Gouverneur General de l'ile Chakerbakerben (1980)
Brahim Who? (1982)
The Soul That Brays (1984)
Komany (1989)
The Night of the Crime (1992)
The Years of Exile (2002)
Tabite or Not Tabite (2005)
Look at the King in the Moon (2011)

References

Moroccan film producers
Moroccan male stage actors
Living people
Moroccan writers in French
Moroccan film directors
1945 births
Moroccan screenwriters
Moroccan male film actors
20th-century Moroccan male actors